The KSB Open was a professional golf tournament that was held in Japan. Founded as the KSB Kagawa Open in 1981, it was an event on the Japan Golf Tour in 1983 and again from 1989. It was played until 1999, after which it was merged with the Descente Classic to create the Munsingwear Open KSB Cup.

Tournament hosts

Winners

Notes

References

External links
Coverage on Japan Golf Tour's official site

Defunct golf tournaments in Japan
Former Japan Golf Tour events
Sport in Kagawa Prefecture
Sports competitions in Okinawa Prefecture
Recurring sporting events disestablished in 1981
Recurring sporting events disestablished in 1999
1999 disestablishments in Japan